Johan Emil Seth Carelius (21 February 1878 in Stockholm–27 September 1966 in Stockholm), was a Swedish conductor and merchant associated with the Swedish Royal Court, active in the Royal Court Orchestra.

Distinctions

Orders
 : Knight of the Order of the Polar Star
 : Knight of the Order of Vasa
 : Knight 1. Class of the Order of St. Olav
 : Knight 1. Class of the Order of the White Rose of Finland
 : Knight of the Order of the Crown of Italy
 : Officer of the Order of Leopold II
 : Order of the Three Stars
 : RKkr

Academic
  Associé n:o 157 of the Royal Swedish Academy of Music

Other
 : Litteris et Artibus
 : Gold medal of the Royal Swedish Pro Patria Society
  Stockholm: Saint Eric's Medal
  Silver Medal of the Red Cross of Sweden
  Medal of the Red Cross of Austria
  Medal of the Red Cross of Prussia
     Honorary plaque of the Associations of Singers of Sweden, Norway, Denmark and Finland

References

Swedish conductors (music)
Male conductors (music)
1878 births
1966 deaths
Musicians from Stockholm
Knights of the Order of the Polar Star
Knights of the Order of Vasa
Order of Saint Olav
Order of the White Rose of Finland
Officers of the Order of Leopold II
Litteris et Artibus recipients
Members of the Royal Swedish Academy of Music